Cardiapoda placenta, common name the flat cardiapod, is a species of sea snail, a rare pelagic gastropod mollusc in the family Carinariidae.

This species is found worldwide in warm seas between latitudes 40° North and 40° South at depths of up to 650 m.

Description 
The maximum recorded shell length is 35 mm.

Habitat 
Minimum recorded depth is 0 m. Maximum recorded depth is 203 m.

References

Further reading 
 Powell A. W. B., New Zealand Mollusca, William Collins Publishers Ltd, Auckland, New Zealand 1979 
 Seapy, Roger R. 2008. Cardiapoda d'Orbigny 1836. Version 12 February 2008, Tree of Life Web Project: Cardiapoda placenta
 Malacolog Version 4.1.0 : A Database of Western Atlantic Marine Mollusca

Carinariidae
Gastropods described in 1830
Taxa named by René Lesson